Wesley Todd Bender (August 2, 1970 –  March 5, 2018) was an American football running back in the National Football League who played for the Los Angeles Raiders and New Orleans Saints. He played college football for the USC Trojans.

Bender died in 2018.

References

1970 births
2018 deaths
American football fullbacks
Los Angeles Raiders players
New Orleans Saints players
USC Trojans football players